World War Z is a first-person shooter zombie apocalypse mobile game developed by Phosphor Games and published by Paramount Digital Entertainment. The game was released on May 30, 2013, prior to the release of the feature film of the same name, which was directed by Marc Forster and starred Brad Pitt.

Gameplay
A first-person shooter game available on iOS and Android, World War Z features 28 levels with zombie combat, puzzle-solving, weapons and armor. The story runs parallel to the film; however, it features a new set of characters. Players assume the role of Doug, a survivor of the zombie apocalypse. Doug travels the world trying to find his son, who is located in Japan.

Reception

Droid Life called the game "visually impressive." Game Revolution called it an "engaging movie tie-in." Kotaku referred to the game as better than expected. Game Trailers said the game's controls may "change the first-person genre on mobile." Modojo said the game's control scheme "removes the hassle" of playing first person shooter games on touchscreens.

References

2013 video games
First-person shooters
Android (operating system) games
IOS games
Unreal Engine games
Video games developed in the United States
Video games about zombies
World War Z (franchise)